Kuril Ainu or Kuril, is an extinct and poorly attested Ainu language of the Kuril Islands, now part of Russia. The main inhabited islands were Kunashir, Iturup and Urup in the south, and Shumshu in the north. Other islands either had small populations (such as Paramushir) or were visited for fishing or hunting. There may have been a small mixed Kuril–Itelmen population at the southern tip of the Kamchatka Peninsula.

The Ainu of the Kurils appear to have been a relatively recent expansion from Hokkaidō, displacing an indigenous Okhotsk culture, which may have been related to the modern Itelmens. When the Kuril Islands passed to Japanese control in 1875, many of the northern Kuril Ainu evacuated to Ust-Bolsheretsky District in Kamchatka, where about 100 still live. In the decades after the islands passed to Soviet control in 1945, most of the remaining southern Kuril Ainu evacuated to Hokkaidō, where they have since been assimilated.

References

Ainu languages
Russian Ainu people
Extinct languages of Asia
Kuril Islands
Languages extinct in the 1960s